The Trenton Trentonians were a minor league baseball team that played in Trenton, New Jersey, from 1883 to 1885. They were members of the Interstate Association in 1883 and the Eastern League from 1884 to 1885. Their home games were played at the Trenton Base Ball Grounds in 1883 and at the East State Street Grounds from 1884 to 1885.

The 1884 Trentonians won the Eastern League pennant, the league's championship, with a season record of 46–39, which placed them four games ahead of the second-place Lancaster Ironsides.

References

External links 
Statistics from Baseball-Reference
Statistics from Stats Crew

1883 establishments in New Jersey
1885 disestablishments in New Jersey
Baseball teams established in 1883
Baseball teams disestablished in 1885
Defunct baseball teams in New Jersey
Sports in Trenton, New Jersey
Professional baseball teams in New Jersey